is a district located in Fukushima Prefecture, Japan.

As of 2003, the district has an estimated population of 48,399 and a density of 105.98 persons per km2. The total area is 456.70 km2.

Towns and villages
Asakawa
Furudono
Ishikawa
Hirata
Tamakawa

Districts in Fukushima Prefecture